Orfeo Matthew Angelucci (Orville Angelucci) (June 25, 1912 – July 24, 1993) was one of the most unusual of the mid-1950s so-called "contactees" who claimed to be in contact with extraterrestrials.

Angelucci claimed that he suffered from poor health and extreme nervousness for most of his life, and eventually moved for health-related reasons from Trenton, New Jersey, to California in 1948, where he took a job on the assembly line at the Lockheed aircraft plant in Burbank. Another contactee, George Van Tassel, was also employed for a time at this plant.

In his books, Orfeo Angelucci says he was particularly terrified of thunderstorms and was attracted to California because he had heard that thunderstorms were rare there. Angelucci wrote the first version of his theories of matter, energy and life, The Nature of Infinite Entities in 1952, based on "research" done earlier in Trenton, including the launching of a giant cluster of weather balloons.

According to Angelucci in his book The Secret of the Saucers (1955), he first encountered flying saucers and their friendly human-appearing pilots during his drives home from the aircraft plant during the summer of 1952. These superhuman space people were handsome, often transparent and highly spiritual. Eventually Angelucci was taken in an unmanned saucer to Earth orbit, where he saw a giant "mother ship" drift past a porthole. He also described having experienced a "missing time" episode and eventually remembered living for a week in the body of "space brother" Neptune, in a more evolved society on "the largest asteroid", the remains of a destroyed planet, while  his usual body wandered around the aircraft plant in a daze.

In his later book, The Son of the Sun, Angelucci related an account that he claimed had been told to him by a medical doctor calling himself Adam, whose experiences were similar to his own. He also published several pamphlets on space-brotherly themes, such as "Million Year Prophecy" (1959), "Concrete Evidence" (1959) and "Again We Exist" (1960).

References 

 Lewis, James R., editor, UFOs and Popular Culture, Santa Barbara, CA: ABC-CLIO, Inc., 2000. .
 Story, Ronald D., editor, The Encyclopedia of Extraterrestrial Encounters, NY, NY: New American Library, 2001.

External links 

 Overview of 1950s Contactees
 A webpage devoted to Angelucci
 In the spring of 1952 Angelucci wrote to Linus Pauling concerning Angelucci's biological theories
 A summary of a talk by Orfeo Angelucci in fellow contactee Daniel Fry's newsletter
 Long John Nebel's radio interviews with 1950s contactees

1912 births
1993 deaths
American UFO writers
Contactees
People from Burbank, California
People from Trenton, New Jersey
UFO sightings in the United States
Ufologists
20th-century American non-fiction writers